Purpuraturris omnipurpurata is a species of sea snail, a marine gastropod mollusk in the family Turridae, the turrids.

Description

Distribution

References

 Vera-Pelaez, J. L., Vega-Luz, R. & Lozano-Francisco, M. C. (2000). Five new species of the genus Turris Roding, 1798 (Gastropoda; Turridae; Turrinae) of the Philippines and one new species of the southern Indo-Pacific. Malakos [Revista de la Asociacióon Malacolóogica Andaluza]. Monografia 2, 1-29.

External links
 Chase, K., Watkins, M., Safavi-Hemami, H. & Olivera, B. M. (2022). Integrating venom peptide libraries into a phylogenetic and broader biological framework. Frontiers in Molecular Biosciences. 9: 784419.

omnipurpurata
Gastropods described in 2000